In linear algebra, an -by- square matrix  is called invertible (also nonsingular or nondegenerate), if there exists an -by- square matrix  such that

where  denotes the -by- identity matrix and the multiplication used is ordinary matrix multiplication. Matrix inversion is the process of finding the matrix  that satisfies the prior equation for a given invertible matrix .

A square matrix that is not invertible is called singular or degenerate. A square matrix is singular if and only if its determinant is zero. Singular matrices are rare in the sense that if a square matrix's entries are randomly selected from any finite region on the number line or complex plane, the probability that the matrix is singular is 0, that is, it will "almost never" be singular. Non-square matrices (-by- matrices for which ) do not have an inverse. However, in some cases such a matrix may have a left inverse or right inverse. If  has rank , then it has a right inverse, an -by- matrix  such that .

While the most common case is that of matrices over the real or complex numbers, all these definitions can be given for matrices over any ring. However, in the case of the ring being commutative, the condition for a square matrix to be invertible is that its determinant is invertible in the ring, which in general is a stricter requirement than being nonzero. For a noncommutative ring, the usual determinant is not defined.  The conditions for existence of left-inverse or right-inverse are more complicated, since a notion of rank does not exist over rings.

The set of  invertible matrices together with the operation of matrix multiplication (and entries from ring ) form a group, the general linear group of degree , denoted .

Properties

The invertible matrix theorem 
Let  be a square -by- matrix over a field  (e.g., the field  of real numbers). The following statements are equivalent (i.e., they are either all true or all false for any given matrix):

 There is an -by- matrix  such that .
  is invertible, that is,  has an inverse, is nonsingular, and is nondegenerate.
  is row-equivalent to the -by- identity matrix .
  is column-equivalent to the -by- identity matrix .
  has  pivot positions.
  has full rank; that is, .
 The columns of  span .
 .
 The matrix  can be expressed as a finite product of elementary matrices.

Other properties 
Furthermore, the following properties hold for an invertible matrix :

 
  for nonzero scalar 
 

In which case, one can apply the iterative Gram–Schmidt process to this initial set to determine the rows of the inverse . 

A matrix that is its own inverse (i.e., a matrix  such that  and ), is called an involutory matrix.

In relation to its adjugate 

If  is an invertible matrix, then

In relation to the identity matrix 
It follows from the associativity of matrix multiplication that if
 

Density 
This is true because singular matrices are the roots of the determinant function. This is a continuous function because it is a polynomial in the entries of the matrix. Thus in the language of measure theory, almost all -by- matrices are invertible.

Furthermore, the -by- invertible matrices are a dense open set in the topological space of all -by- matrices.  Equivalently, the set of singular matrices is closed and nowhere dense in the space of -by- matrices.

In practice however, one may encounter non-invertible matrices. And in numerical calculations, matrices which are invertible, but close to a non-invertible matrix, can still be problematic; such matrices are said to be ill-conditioned.

Examples 
An example with rank of n-1 to be a non-invertible matrix
 
We can easily see the rank of this 2*2 matrix is one, which is n-1≠n, so it is a non-invertible matrix.

Consider the following 2-by-2 matrix:
 
The matrix  is invertible. To check this, one can compute that , which is non-zero. 

As an example of a non-invertible, or singular, matrix, consider the matrix
 

Methods of matrix inversion

Gaussian elimination 
Gaussian elimination is a useful and easy way to compute the inverse of a matrix. To compute a matrix inverse using this method, an augmented matrix is first created with the left side being the matrix to invert and the right side being the identity matrix. Then, Gaussian elimination is used to convert the left side into the identity matrix, which causes the right side to become the inverse of the input matrix.

For example, take the following matrix:  

The first step to compute its inverse is to create the augmented matrix  

Call the first row of this matrix  and the second row . Then, add row 1 to row 2  This yields  

Next, subtract row 2, multiplied by 3, from row 1  which yields 

Finally, multiply row 1 by –1  and row 2 by 2  This yields the identity matrix on the left side and the inverse matrix on the right: 

Thus, 

The reason it works is that the process of Gaussian Elimination can be viewed as a sequence of applying left matrix mutliplication using elementary row operations using Elementary matrix, such as 

Applying right-multiplication using  we get  And the right side  which is the inverse we want.  

The two portions will be transformed using the same sequence of elementary row operations. When the left portion becomes , the right portion applied the same elementary row operation sequence will become .

Newton's method 
A generalization of Newton's method as used for a multiplicative inverse algorithm may be convenient, if it is convenient to find a suitable starting seed:

Victor Pan and John Reif have done work that includes ways of generating a starting seed. Byte magazine summarised one of their approaches.

Newton's method is particularly useful when dealing with families of related matrices that behave enough like the sequence manufactured for the homotopy above: sometimes a good starting point for refining an approximation for the new inverse can be the already obtained inverse of a previous matrix that nearly matches the current matrix, for example, the pair of sequences of inverse matrices used in obtaining matrix square roots by Denman–Beavers iteration; this may need more than one pass of the iteration at each new matrix, if they are not close enough together for just one to be enough. Newton's method is also useful for "touch up" corrections to the Gauss–Jordan algorithm which has been contaminated by small errors due to imperfect computer arithmetic.

Cayley–Hamilton method 
 

 

The formula can be rewritten in terms of complete Bell polynomials of arguments  as

Eigendecomposition 

If matrix  can be eigendecomposed, and if none of its eigenvalues are zero, then  is invertible and its inverse is given by
 

 is symmetric,  is guaranteed to be an orthogonal matrix, therefore  Furthermore, because  is a diagonal matrix, its inverse is easy to calculate:

Cholesky decomposition 

If matrix  is positive definite, then its inverse can be obtained as
 

Analytic solution 

Writing the transpose of the matrix of cofactors, known as an adjugate matrix, can also be an efficient way to calculate the inverse of small matrices, but this recursive method is inefficient for large matrices. To determine the inverse, we calculate a matrix of cofactors:

 

so that
 

Inversion of 2 × 2 matrices 
The cofactor equation listed above yields the following result for  matrices. Inversion of these matrices can be done as follows:
 

This is possible because  is the reciprocal of the determinant of the matrix in question, and the same strategy could be used for other matrix sizes.

The Cayley–Hamilton method gives

Inversion of 3 × 3 matrices 
A computationally efficient  matrix inversion is given by
 

(where the scalar  is not to be confused with the matrix ).

If the determinant is non-zero, the matrix is invertible, with the elements of the intermediary matrix on the right side above given by
 

The determinant of  can be computed by applying the rule of Sarrus as follows:
 

The Cayley–Hamilton decomposition gives
 

The general  inverse can be expressed concisely in terms of the cross product and triple product. If a matrix  (consisting of three column vectors, and ) is invertible, its inverse is given by 
 

 

The correctness of the formula can be checked by using cross- and triple-product properties and by noting that for groups, left and right inverses always coincide. Dividing by 
 

For example, the first diagonal is:

Inversion of 4 × 4 matrices 
With increasing dimension, expressions for the inverse of  get complicated. For , the Cayley–Hamilton method leads to an expression that is still tractable:

Blockwise inversion 
Matrices can also be inverted blockwise by using the following analytic inversion formula:

( must be square, so that it can be inverted. Furthermore,  and  must be nonsingular.)

This technique was reinvented several times and is due to Hans Boltz (1923), who used it for the inversion of geodetic matrices, and Tadeusz Banachiewicz (1937), who generalized it and proved its correctness.

The nullity theorem says that the nullity of  equals the nullity of the sub-block in the lower right of the inverse matrix, and that the nullity of  equals the nullity of the sub-block in the upper right of the inverse matrix.

Equating Equations and  leads to

where Equation is the Woodbury matrix identity, which is equivalent to the binomial inverse theorem.

By the Weinstein–Aronszajn identity, one of the two matrices in the block-diagonal matrix is invertible exactly when the other is.

Since a blockwise inversion of an  matrix requires inversion of two half-sized matrices and 6 multiplications between two half-sized matrices, it can be shown that a divide and conquer algorithm that uses blockwise inversion to invert a matrix runs with the same time complexity as the matrix multiplication algorithm that is used internally.

This formula simplifies significantly when the upper right block matrix  is the zero matrix. This formulation is useful when the matrices  and  have relatively simple inverse formulas (or pseudo inverses in the case where the blocks are not all square. In this special case, the block matrix inversion formula stated in full generality above becomes

By Neumann series 
If a matrix  has the property that
 

then  is nonsingular and its inverse may be expressed by a Neumann series:

 

Truncating the sum results in an "approximate" inverse which may be useful as a preconditioner. Note that a truncated series can be accelerated exponentially by noting that the Neumann series is a geometric sum. As such, it satisfies 
 .

Therefore, only  matrix multiplications are needed to compute  terms of the sum.

More generally, if  is "near" the invertible matrix  in the sense that
 

then  is nonsingular and its inverse is
 

If it is also the case that  has rank 1 then this simplifies to

p-adic approximation 

The method relies on solving  linear systems via Dixon's method of -adic approximation (each in ) and is available as such in software specialized in arbitrary-precision matrix operations, for example, in IML.

Reciprocal basis vectors method 

 
We then have , where  is the Kronecker delta. We also have , as required. If the vectors  are not linearly independent, then  and the matrix  is not invertible (has no inverse).

Derivative of the matrix inverse 
Suppose that the invertible matrix A depends on a parameter t. Then the derivative of the inverse of A with respect to t is given by
 

To derive the above expression for the derivative of the inverse of A, one can differentiate the definition of the matrix inverse  and then solve for the inverse of A:
 

Subtracting  from both sides of the above and multiplying on the right by  gives the correct expression for the derivative of the inverse:
 

Similarly, if  is a small number then
 

More generally, if

 

then,

 

Given a positive integer ,

 

Therefore,

Generalized inverse 
Some of the properties of inverse matrices are shared by generalized inverses (for example, the Moore–Penrose inverse), which can be defined for any m-by-n matrix.

Applications 
For most practical applications, it is not necessary to invert a matrix to solve a system of linear equations; however, for a unique solution, it is necessary that the matrix involved be invertible.

Decomposition techniques like LU decomposition are much faster than inversion, and various fast algorithms for special classes of linear systems have also been developed.

Regression/least squares 
Although an explicit inverse is not necessary to estimate the vector of unknowns, it is the easiest way to estimate their accuracy, found in the diagonal of a matrix inverse (the posterior covariance matrix of the vector of unknowns). However, faster algorithms to compute only the diagonal entries of a matrix inverse are known in many cases.

Matrix inverses in real-time simulations 
Matrix inversion plays a significant role in computer graphics, particularly in 3D graphics rendering and 3D simulations. Examples include screen-to-world ray casting, world-to-subspace-to-world object transformations, and physical simulations.

Matrix inverses in MIMO wireless communication 
Matrix inversion also plays a significant role in the MIMO (Multiple-Input, Multiple-Output) technology in wireless communications. The MIMO system consists of N transmit and M receive antennas. Unique signals, occupying the same frequency band, are sent via N transmit antennas and are received via M receive antennas. The signal arriving at each receive antenna will be a linear combination of the N transmitted signals forming an N × M transmission matrix H. It is crucial for the matrix H to be invertible for the receiver to be able to figure out the transmitted information.

See also

References

Further reading

External links 

Moore-Penrose Inverse Matrix

Linear algebra
Matrices
Determinants
Matrix theory